The Snider Bridge is located west of Corning, Iowa, United States. In June 1885 the Adams County Board of Supervisors received 17 petitions for new bridges, including one from George Snider. The board decided to erect iron bridges for the longest two spans, including this one. They awarded a contract for both bridges to Reeve, Ward and Keepers of Clinton, Iowa for $1,451.00. This span was completed later in the year. The pinned Pratt pony truss continues to carry traffic on the gravel road over the creek. It was listed on the National Register of Historic Places in 1998.

References

Bridges completed in 1885
Road bridges on the National Register of Historic Places in Iowa
Transportation buildings and structures in Adams County, Iowa
Truss bridges in Iowa
National Register of Historic Places in Adams County, Iowa